The Court of High Commission was the supreme ecclesiastical court in England. Some of its powers was to take action against conspiracies, plays, tales, contempts, false rumours, and books. It was instituted by the Crown in 1559 to enforce the Act of Uniformity and the Act of Supremacy. John Whitgift, the Archbishop of Canterbury, obtained increased powers for the court by the 1580s. He proposed and had passed the Seditious Sectaries Act 1593, making Puritanism an offence. 

The court reached the height of its powers during the Reformation. It was dissolved by the Long Parliament in 1641.  The court was convened at will by the sovereign, and had near unlimited power over civil as well as church matters. There were also Scottish Courts of High Commission which vied with the General Assembly and lower church courts for authority.

Dissolution by the Triennial Act

The Court of High Commission was dissolved by the Triennial Act, passed by Parliament in 1641. The Triennial Act required that the Crown summon Parliament every three years. It also impeached Archbishop William Laud, who had been supported by Charles I. Laud's new ideas and prayers had upset the Scots, and when Charles was refused an army from Parliament, which did not trust him, he created his own. This led in part to the English Civil War.

References

Sources
'High Commission, Court of' , retrieved 4 August 2005
The Glorious Revolution of 1688 , retrieved 4 August 2005
' A History of the Woodforde Family from 1300' , retrieved 4 August 2005
 Dutton, Richard (1991). Mastering the Revels: The Regulation and Censorship of English Renaissance Drama, London: Palgrave Macmillan 

16th century in England
17th century in England
Former courts and tribunals in England and Wales
Ecclesiastical courts
History of the Church of England
1559 establishments in England
Courts and tribunals established in 1559
1641 disestablishments in England
Courts and tribunals disestablished in 1644